Jalpally is a satellite town of Hyderabad in Rangareddy district of the Indian state of Telangana.

Government 

Jalpally municipality is the civic body of the town. On 11 April 2016, the gram panchayats of Jalpally Kothapet, Phadisharif and Balapur were merged to form Jalpally Municipality.

References 

Cities and towns in Ranga Reddy district